Acting Hetman or Appointed Hetman was a title during the 17th, and 18th centuries, in the Cossack Hetmanate. The acting hetman was the governing authority in the Cossack Hetmanate temporarily substituted for the Hetman.

Appointment
The acting hetman was appointed by the hetman himself or elected by the Council of Officers (starshyna). More than often the office was appointed by the Hetman as his deputy rather than elected by the General Military Council or the Cossack Council. His appointment could have been temporary and quickly abrupt and was caused by a necessity to command a group of forces at other portions of military front or tactical direction, similarly to the "field hetman" of Polish–Lithuanian Commonwealth. 

Usually acting hetman was chosen out of the General Officer Staff and more than often it was a General Quartermaster, a leader of the staff. There were incidents when acting hetman was chosen among colonels (a regional leaders) such as Yakym Somko.

Duties
Acting hetman performed duties of the hetman when the later was absent during military campaigns, foreign travels, or his incapacitation. As well as a temporary replacement if the hetman's office became vacant, because of death, abdication, or deposition. Sometimes the appointed hetman acted as a full-pledged hetman as Filon Dzhalaliy when he was elected in 1651 and 1655 as well as Ivan Bohun when he was elected after the Battle of Berestechko (Bohdan Khmelnytsky was taken as a prisoner) or as in case of Pavlo Polubotok when he acted as hetman due to the death of such.

On a territory of the left-bank Ukraine the office often was a counteractive to the righteously elected hetman. Sometimes acting hetmans were appointed by foreign leaders such as Ivan Bezpaly was appointed acting hetman by the Muscovite voivode of Belgorod. Among such hetmans were Yakiv Somko, Ivan Bezpaly and others.

Notable appointments
At times of Bohdan Khmelnytsky such hetmans were Stanislav Krychevsky (1649) and Ivan Zolotarenko (1654-55). Some notable acting hetmans who held this form of the office were Yakym Somko who was appointed by Yurii Khmelnytsky in 1660 until his execution in 1663, Demian Mnohohrishny was appointed by Petro Doroshenko from 1668-1669 until becoming full-time hetman, and Pavlo Polubotok who served as acting hetman in 1722, till 1724. Among other appointed hetmans were such prominent colonels as S.Podobai (1652), Ya.Voronchenko (1654), D.Yermolayenko (1665), H.Vytyazenko (1665), Yakiv Lyzohub (1696), Ivan Obydovsky (1700-01), I.Myrovych (1704), M.Myklashevsky (1706) and others.

See also
 General Officer Staff (Hetmanate)
 Hetman of Zaporizhian Host

References

External links
 Appointed Hetman at website of the Institute of History of Ukraine.

Titles of national or ethnic leadership
Cossack Hetmanate
 
Military ranks of Ukraine
Military organization of Cossacks